Club Social y Deportivo Juventud Retalteca  was a Guatemalan professional football club based in Retalhuleu and who competed in the Liga Nacional, the nation's top footballing division.

History
Nicknamed Los Algodoneros (the Cotton pickers), the club was founded on 6 May 1951 by José Maria Olivar and Guillermo Gordillo. The club won promotion to Liga Mayor in 2009  after spending years in the Primera División de Ascenso and defeated national champions C.D. Jalapa 5–0 in the season's opener on August 1, 2009.

In February 2012, a car accident in which midfielder Daniel Linares died left the team in shock.

They were dissolved in 2012 after surmountable financial problems.

Stadium
They play their home games at the Estadio Dr. Óscar Monterroso Izaguirre.

Honours
Copa de Guatemala 2'''
1980, 1985

Coaches
 Gregorio Bundio
 Manuel de Jesús Castañeda
 Daniel Casas
 Carlos García Cantarero (2010)
 Manuel Castañeda (2011–)
 Mauro Oliveira

External links
Official Website

References

Defunct football clubs in Guatemala
Association football clubs established in 1951
1951 establishments in Guatemala